The European Film Forum Scanorama is a film festival in Lithuania held annually in November. Since then she is the manager and artistic director of the festival. The festival was usually held in three cities: Vilnius, Kaunas and Klaipėda, and recently Šiauliai was added to its locations. Originally, it was established as a film forum of Nordic countries. Over time its scope grew and it had eventually become a forum for films from all European countries.

In 2008, Scanorama established the Baltic short film competition "New Baltic Cinema". In 2022 it was renamed to "Glimpses of Europe", to address the expanded scope of the festival.

In 2017 Scanorama, together with six other European film festivals established the film festival network "Moving Images – Open Borders" to enhance the cooperation of European fillmmakers.

In 2022, the 20th anniversary Scanorama was held in Vilnius, Kaunas, Klaipėda, Šiauliai, Panevėžys, and Alytus.

References

External links
Scanorama (English-language site)

Film festivals in Lithuania
2003 establishments in Lithuania
Film festivals established in 2003